Henk Wamsteker (1 May 1900 – 12 July 1959) was a Dutch footballer. He played in two matches for the Netherlands national football team from 1925 to 1929.

References

External links
 

1900 births
1959 deaths
Dutch footballers
Netherlands international footballers
Place of birth missing
Association footballers not categorized by position